Porterville Transit (PT) was the primary bus agency serving residents and visitors to Porterville, the fourth-largest city in Tulare County, California. It was operated by the city and offered both fixed routes and dial-a-ride local service within Porterville, with all fixed routes operating out of a central transit center. Buses connecting Porterville's transit hub to nearby census-designated places were handled by Tulare County Area Transit (TCaT), including services to Tulare and Visalia (TCaT Route 40), Springville (TCaT Route 70), Terra Bella (80), and Poplar and Woodville (90).

Prior to the COVID-19 pandemic in California, PT also offered service to the nearby Tule River Indian Reservation. Porterville Transit routes are now operated by the Tulare County Regional Transit Agency (TCRTA), which was formed as a joint powers agency in 2020 by the city and county governments of Tulare County, with the exception of Visalia.

History
In 1980, the city began to offer public transportation as a dial-a-ride point-to-point service branded Dial-A-COLT (City Operated Local Transit). The city entered an agreement with TCRTA to provide public transportation services within the Porterville urbanized area in 1983, with the County providing a share of the operating budget. A locally owned company, Sierra Management, was formed in 1994 to manage the transportation service operations, including drivers, dispatchers, and administrative personnel. The city is responsible for day-to-day administration, including fleet maintenance and repair, under the Department of Public Works.

With increased demand, the city began offering two regular fixed routes as Porterville Transit starting in July 1997. Dial-A-COLT was reprioritized to focus on elderly and Americans with Disabilities Act passengers in August 2006, with regular transit taken over by Porterville Transit. In April 2020, the city began operating the transPORT service, mimicking on-demand private rideshare services like Uber and Lyft.

Services

Porterville Transit operates seven days a week, with no service provided on specific holidays (New Year's Day, July 4, Thanksgiving, and Christmas).

Fixed routes
All fixed routes originate from the Porterville Transit Center (PTC), 61 W. Oak Ave. Routes 1 through 8 are one-way loops that return to PTC; Route 9 is a linear route between PTC and the Tule River Indian Reservation. Route 9, which began service in 2013, was the most popular route by 2016, accounting for approximately 20% of all riders; Route 3 was the most frequently-boarded, averaging 17.5 boardings per revenue-hour.

Routes 4, 7, and 8 were suspended due to low ridership amid the COVID-19 pandemic in California; Route 9 was suspended at the request of the Tule River tribe. The City Council voted to resume Route 4 in August 2021.

Fares
Due to the ongoing COVID-19 pandemic in California, TCRTA suspended fare collection on all transit routes and participating sub-agencies, including Tulare County Area Transit (TCaT), Tulare InterModal Express (TIME), Dinuba Transit, Porterville Transit, and Woodlake Transit starting on July 1, 2021. Partial support was provided by the San Joaquin Valley Air Pollution Control District.

Prior to the suspension of fares, exact change was required. Porterville Transit also offers a contactless "GO Card" (smart card and onboard farebox; passengers may pre-purchase single-trip fares; 1-, 7-, or 31-day passes; or preload the card with cash. Alternatively, passengers may pay using the agency's mobile app, which will display a QR code to be scanned by the onboard farebox.

Notes

Transfers
Bus services connecting Porterville with other communities within Tulare County are provided by Tulare County Area Transit (branded TCaT). TCaT riders on Routes 40, 60, 70, 80, and 90 may transfer to Porterville Transit buses for free.

Fleet
In August 2021, the transit fleet included 10 battery-electric buses, 14 CNG transit buses, 12 battery-electric vans, 3 CNG cutaway buses, and 9 gasoline minivans.

Facilities
The Transit Center, which opened in May 2003, also houses the bus dispatch center and ticket office. Bus maintenance, fueling, and storage are performed at the City of Porterville Department of Public Works, Field Services Division facility on North Prospect Street, between W Grand Ave and W Morton Ave.

References

External links

Official website

Public transportation in the San Joaquin Valley Area
Bus transportation in California
Public transportation in Tulare County, California
Transit agencies in California